North Salem is a town in Eel River Township, Hendricks County, Indiana, United States. The population was 518 at the 2010 Census.

History
North Salem was laid out in 1835. A post office was established at North Salem in 1839. North Salem was incorporated as a town in 1899.

Geography
North Salem is located at  (39.859423, -86.645722).

The nearby waterways Eel River and Big Walnut Creek offer ample fishing and scenery.

The surrounding land consists of low flat farmland to the east and deep ravines and woodland to the west.

Demographics

2010 census
As of the census of 2010, there were 518 people, 209 households, and 141 families living in the town. The racial makeup of the town was 98.1% White, 0.2% African American, 0.4% Asian, 0.2% from other races, and 1.2% from two or more races. Hispanic or Latino of any race were 0.6% of the population.

There were 209 households, of which 30.6% had children under the age of 18 living with them, 50.2% were married couples living together, 11.0% had a female householder with no husband present, 6.2% had a male householder with no wife present, and 32.5% were non-families. 26.3% of all households were made up of individuals, and 13.4% had someone living alone who was 65 years of age or older. The average household size was 2.48 and the average family size was 2.96.

The median age in the town was 39.9 years. 23.9% of residents were under the age of 18; 8.4% were between the ages of 18 and 24; 25.9% were from 25 to 44; 28.8% were from 45 to 64; and 13.1% were 65 years of age or older. The gender makeup of the town was 50.4% male and 49.6% female.

2000 census
As of the census of 2000, there were 591 people, 223 households, and 159 families living in the town. The racial makeup of the town was 98.82% White, 0.17% Native American, 0.68% Asian, and 0.34% from two or more races. Hispanic or Latino of any race were 0.17% of the population.

There were 223 households, out of which 40.8% had children under the age of 18 living with them, 54.3% were married couples living together, 12.6% had a female householder with no husband present, and 28.3% were non-families. 23.8% of all households were made up of individuals, and 13.0% had someone living alone who was 65 years of age or older. The average household size was 2.65 and the average family size was 3.11.

In the town, the population was spread out, with 31.1% under the age of 18, 6.4% from 18 to 24, 30.3% from 25 to 44, 20.5% from 45 to 64, and 11.7% who were 65 years of age or older. The median age was 33 years. For every 100 females, there were 92.5 males. For every 100 females age 18 and over, there were 89.3 males.

The median income for a household in the town was $36,923, and the median income for a family was $44,821. Males had a median income of $35,156 versus $23,295 for females. The per capita income for the town was $18,034. About 6.8% of families and 9.1% of the population were below the poverty line, including 12.6% of those under age 18 and 7.4% of those age 65 or over.

Old Fashion Days Festival
The “Old Fashion Days” Festival is a festival held in North Salem over Labor Day weekend for the last 43 years. This is the largest parade in Hendricks County. In 2020 the festival will celebrate its 45th anniversary and the town's 185th anniversary since establishment.

Education

School
The town of North Salem is served by the North Salem Elementary School. This school is part of the North West Hendricks School Corporation.

References

External links
 Town of North Salem, Indiana website

Towns in Hendricks County, Indiana
Towns in Indiana
Populated places established in 1835
Indianapolis metropolitan area